Western Hills High School, or "West High," is a high school located in the Western Hills area of Cincinnati, Ohio, United States. It is part of the Cincinnati Public Schools district. The school was the location used to film Airborne, a movie filmed in the Cincinnati area.

The school houses two programs: Western Hills Design Technology High School and Western Hills University High School. But the building houses Western Hills Design Technology, Western Hills University and Dater High School.

Western Hills High School was established in 1928. In 1938, the two wings were built to accommodate more classrooms.

Notable alumni
Art Mahaffey - baseball pitcher - 2-time All-Star player.
Herm Wehmeier - baseball pitcher
Jim Boyle – former Pittsburgh Steelers player
Ed Brinkman – baseball infielder – Gold Glove Award winner, All Star selection – Washington Senators, Detroit Tigers, St. Louis Cardinals, Texas Rangers, & New York Yankees
Rosemary Clooney, popular singer and actress
Betty Clooney, singer, actress and television host
Jim Frey, baseball – manager, Kansas City Royals (1980–1981), Chicago Cubs (1984–1986)
Rodney Heath, American footballer – Cincinnati Bengals (1999–2001); Atlanta Falcons (2002)
Mike Middleton, former NFL player
Russ Nixon, baseball – manager, Cincinnati Reds (1982–1983); Atlanta Braves (1988–1990)
Will Radcliff, creator of the Slush Puppie
Jack Reynolds, American footballer – Los Angeles Rams (1970–1980); San Francisco 49ers (1981–1984)
Tuffy Rhodes, baseball – all-time home run leader for foreign-born players in Nippon Professional Baseball in Japan
Pete Rose, baseball – MLB's all-time hit king – Cincinnati Reds (1963–1978, 1984–1989); Philadelphia Phillies (1979–1983); Montreal Expos (1984)
Andy Williams, singer
Don Zimmer, baseball – manager, San Diego Padres (1972–1973); Boston Red Sox (1976–1980); Texas Rangers (1981–1982); Chicago Cubs (1988–1991); New York Yankees (1999) (interim)

Ohio High School Athletic Association State Championships
Baseball – 1948, 1951, 1967, 1977, 1986
Boys Swimming – 1935 
Boys Cross Country – 1944

References

External links
Western Hills High School Alumni Association
Cincinnati Public Schools

High schools in Hamilton County, Ohio
Cincinnati Public Schools
Public high schools in Ohio
Educational institutions established in 1928
1928 establishments in Ohio